Alinea luciae, the Saint Lucia skink, was a species of skink found in Saint Lucia. It is now considered extinct.

References

luciae
Reptiles described in 1887
Reptiles of Saint Lucia
Endemic fauna of Saint Lucia
Taxa named by Samuel Garman